Eun-byul, also spelled Eun-byeol or Un-byol, is a Korean feminine given name. There are 26 hanja with the reading "eun" on the South Korean government's official list of hanja which may be used in given names, among them "silver" and "grace", whereas "byul" is an indigenous Korean word meaning "star" and is not written using hanja.

People with this name include:
Jo Eun-byul (born 1982), South Korean singer and actress
Lee Eun-byul (born 1991), South Korean short track speed skater
Ho Un-byol (born 1992), North Korean football defender
Kim Eun-byeol, South Korean pentathlete, silver medalist in modern pentathlon at the 2010 Asian Games – Women's team
Kim Un-byol, North Korean figure skater, gold medalist in ice dancing at the 2007 and 2008 North Korean Figure Skating Championships
Paek Un-byol, North Korean figure skater, gold medalist in ice dancing at the 2004, 2005, 2009, and 2010 North Korean Figure Skating Championships

Fictional characters with this name include:
Go Eun-byul, in 2015 South Korean television series Who Are You: School 2015
Ha Eun-byeol, in 2020 South Korean television series The Penthouse: War in Life

See also
List of Korean given names

References

Korean feminine given names